Leisa is a feminine given name. Notable people with the name include:

Leisa Goddard, Australian television journalist
Leisa Goodman, American Scientologist
Leisa King, English field hockey player

See also
Lisa (given name)

Feminine given names